Oliver Powell may refer to:

 Oliver S. Powell (banker) (1896–1963)
 Oliver S. Powell (politician) (1830–1888)